Released in late 2012, Odes is the fourth studio album from The Flowers of Hell. It is a covers record and the first release from the group to feature vocals and verse-chorus-verse song structures. It was premiered by Lou Reed, who opened the twelfth and final episode of his New York Shuffle radio show praising the group and airing three songs in a row, "O Superheroin" (a marriage of Laurie Anderson's "O Superman" and Lou Reed's "Heroin"), "Mr. Tambourine Man" (re-imagined to sound like The Velvet Underground circa 1967), and "Calling Occupants of Interplanetary Craft".

The group collaborated with Czech dissident musician Ivo Pospíšil (DG 307, The Plastic People of the Universe, Půlnoc) on a reworking of the Prague underground classic "Muchomůrky Bílé", and with British Sea Power's Neil Wilkinson and Abi Fry (a founding member of The Flowers of Hell and two times Mercury Prize nominee) on Fleetwood Mac's "Over and Over".

Track listing 
 Avery Island / April 1 (Neutral Milk Hotel) - 1:23
 Atmosphere (Joy Division) - 4:38
 Muchomůrky Bílé (Destroying Angel) (Plastic People of The Universe) - 3:47
 Walk On The Wild Side (Lou Reed) - 3:30
 Run Run Run (The Velvet Underground) - 4:27
 The Last Beat of My Heart (Siouxsie and the Banshees) - 3:51
 Mr. Tambourine Man (Bob Dylan) -  4:02
 Super-Electric (Stereolab) - 3:56
 O Superheroin ("O Superman" by Laurie Anderson / "Heroin" by Lou Reed) - 4:36
 Over and Over (Fleetwood Mac) - 4:19
 Calling Occupants Of Interplanetary Craft (Klaatu) - 5:03
 On A Swirling Ship (Greg Jarvis) - 2:57

Bonus Tracks
 The Last Beat of My Heart (Orchestral Mix) (Siouxsie and the Banshees) - 3:44
 No Side To Fall In (The Raincoats) - 1:48

Personnel 
 Acoustic Guitar - Jeremiah Knight
 Bass - Ronnie Morris, Steve Head, Neil Wilkinson
 Baritone Sax - Yvo Boom
 Cello - Jennifer Moersch
 Double Bass - Hollie Stevenett
 Drums & Percussion - Sean Berry, Ami Spears, Greg Jarvis
 Electric Guitar - Greg Jarvis, Chris McCann, Jeremiah Knight
 Flute - Brian Taylor
 Harmonica - Barry Newman, Greg Jarvis
 Hammond - Greg Jarvis, Brian Taylor
 Piano - Abi Fry, Greg Jarvis
 Trumpet - Owen James, Ira Zingraff
 Vibraphone - Greg Jarvis
 Violin - Jeff Taylor, Laura C. Bates, Rose Bolton, Lee Rose
 Vocals - Francis Hurley, Ivo Pospíšil, Tamara Kubova, Ami Spears, Laura Rafferty, Neil Wilkinson, Abi Fry, Greg Jarvis, Debbie Suede

References 

2012 albums
The Flowers of Hell albums